Orašac is a village located in the municipality of Obrenovac, Belgrade, Serbia. As of 2011 census, it has a population of 603 inhabitants.

References

Suburbs of Belgrade